Minime or Minimes may refer to:

 Mini-Me, character in the Austin Powers films
 MiniMe, PCLinuxOS minimal installation
 Les Minimes, marina at La Rochelle, France
 Lac des Minimes, small lake in Paris, France
 Stade des Minimes, rugby league stadium in Toulouse, France

See also
 Minim (disambiguation)
 Minimi (disambiguation)